Craig Morgan (born 1965) is an American country singer.

Craig Morgan may also refer to:
Craig Morgan (album), his debut album
Craig Morgan (footballer) (born 1985), Welsh international footballer
Craig Morgan (rugby union) (born 1978), Wales international rugby union player
Craig Morgan (hurler), Irish hurler

Morgan, Craig